Pratt is a family name.

Pratt may also refer to:

Places
Pratt, Kansas
Pratt County, Kansas
Pratt, Minnesota, an unincorporated settlement in Steele County
Pratt, Missouri
Pratt Mountain, a summit in New Hampshire
Pratt, West Virginia
Pratt Junction, Wisconsin

Schools 
Edmund T. Pratt Jr. School of Engineering, the engineering school of Duke University
Pratt Community College, two-year junior college located in Pratt, Kansas
Pratt Institute, a specialized, private college in New York City

Libraries
E. J. Pratt Library, University of Toronto, Ontario, Canada
Enoch Pratt Free Library, Baltimore, Maryland, United States

See also
Justice Pratt (disambiguation)
Knuth-Morris-Pratt algorithm
Prat (disambiguation)
Pratt & Whitney
Pratt knot
Pratt truss bridge design
Pratt's Bottom